The 2011 German motorcycle Grand Prix was the ninth round of the 2011 Grand Prix motorcycle racing season. It took place on the weekend of 15–17 July 2011 at the Sachsenring, located in Hohenstein-Ernstthal, Germany. The 125cc race was notable for producing a dead heat for first place between Héctor Faubel and Johann Zarco. After a photo finish could not separate the riders, Faubel was awarded first place on the basis that he set a faster laptime during the race.

MotoGP classification
Loris Capirossi was replaced by Sylvain Guintoli after the first practice session due to injuries sustained at the Dutch TT.

Moto2 classification

125 cc classification

Championship standings after the race (MotoGP)
Below are the standings for the top five riders and constructors after round nine has concluded.

Riders' Championship standings

Constructors' Championship standings

 Note: Only the top five positions are included for both sets of standings.

References

German motorcycle Grand Prix
German
Motorcycle Grand Prix
German motorcycle Grand Prix